Oricia homalochroa is a moth of the family Notodontidae first described by Cajetan and Rudolf Felder in 1874. It is found from Guatemala south to Panama.

References

Moths described in 1874
Notodontidae